"Sunshine Girl" is a song written by Geoff Stephens and John Carter and performed by Herman's Hermits.  It reached #6 in Norway, #8 in the United Kingdom, #9 in New Zealand, #56 in Australia, #68 in Canada, and #101 in the United States in 1968.

The song was produced by Mickie Most.

References

1968 songs
1968 singles
Songs written by Geoff Stephens
Songs written by John Carter (musician)
Herman's Hermits songs
Song recordings produced by Mickie Most
MGM Records singles